HMS Jumna was a  of the Royal Navy, built at the Bombay Dockyard, initially intended to be named HMS Zebra and launched on 7 March 1848 as Jumna. She was paid off and sold 25 June 1862.

Fate
Jumna arrived at Hobart, Tasmania on 4 November 1881 from Port Louis, Mauritius, with a cargo of sugar and unable to obtain a charter, took in ballast, and left for Fremantle, Western Australia on 19 November and was never seen again.

The Australian National Shipwreck Database reports that she was lost "between Ports, possibly South Fremantle". She carried a crew of four able seamen and 16 apprentices.

Citations

References

1848 ships
Brigs of the Royal Navy
Shipwrecks of Western Australia
Missing ships of Australia
Victorian-era naval ships of the United Kingdom